Irvin Dana Beal (born January 9, 1947 in Ravenna, Ohio) is an American social and political activist, best known for his efforts to legalize marijuana and to promote the benefits of Ibogaine as an addiction treatment. He is a founder and long-term activist in the Youth International Party (Yippies), and founded the Yipster Times newspaper in 1972. The Yipster Times was renamed Overthrow  in 1978, and ended publication in 1989.

History and activism 

Beal was born in Ravenna, Ohio, in 1947. In August 1963, he hitch-hiked to Washington, D.C. to attend the March on Washington and heard Martin Luther King Jr.'s "I Have a Dream" speech. In October 1963, Beal organized a demonstration of 2000 people to protest the Ku Klux Klan's 16th Street Baptist Church bombing in Birmingham.  

In 1971, The New York Times referred to Beal as a "major theoretician and behind‐the‐scenes leader of the underground youth movement.":Beal was described in interviews as a founder of several radical youth groups, including the Yippies, and as organizer of many "pro‐pot" demonstrations, such as the second annual smoke‐in and anti‐C.I.A. heroin march held in Washington July 4.

His friends and associates identified Beal, who does not use his first name, Irvin, as one of the first movement writers to argue for a merger of political radicalism and the psychedelic life style ... Abbie Hoffman and Jerry Rubin, Yippie leaders who garnered national attention during the 1968 Democratic convention demonstrations, agreed in separate telephone interviews that Beal was an important figure in the movement.

"He is a unique blend of a street person and a theoretician," said Mr. Hoffman. "His writings are far more important and impressive than people like me and Jerry Rubin."

Mr. Rubin said Beal's writings "were a strong force in helping us understand who we are." ... Mr. Hoffman and Mr. Rubin said Beal's most important works were "Right on Culture Freaks" and "Weather Yippie," which were rèprinted in more than 100 underground newspapers in this country and abroad.

The articles called for more militancy on the part of young radicals but criticized what Beal saw as the élitism and lack of humanity in the more violent radical groups.Written by Beal in 1969, "Right On, Culture Freaks" has been identified as possibly the first use of the term "Culture Wars"

Dana Beal also helped organize some of the U.S. versions of the "Rock Against Racism" concerts.

Global Marijuana March 

The worldwide Global Million Marijuana March (GMM or MMM) event began in 1999 with Beal as the major organizer. It occurs on the first Saturday of May every year, and now takes place in hundreds of cities around the world in addition to New York City,  which has had various marijuana rallies since 1967.

Beal has a long history of marijuana activism both inside and outside of New York City, and has often been called "The Lenin of the Marijuana Movement". In July 1972 in Miami Beach, Florida Beal was one of the organizers of a Zippie-led marijuana smoke-in outside the 1972 Democratic Convention.

Ibogaine

Beal has promoted ibogaine as an addiction interrupter. Beal asserts that addiction is a disease that can be treated with ibogaine.

Beal helped to organize the Boston Ibogaine forum held in February 2009 at Northeastern University. During the forum, he gave a presentation on the chemistry and pharmacology of ibogaine. Beal also participated in the Ibogaine Forum held at the University of Otago, New Zealand, on 5 and 6 September 2009, as well as a similar information-session in the Netherlands in 2017.

Beal also helped to organize the European Ibogaine Forum, September 2017 in Vienna.

Social engagement

Beal's "Cures Not Wars" site included information on the Global Marijuana March and the use of Ibogaine in addiction treatment. He also works on behalf of people with AIDS and cancer who frequently require medical marijuana.  Dana Beal was given an Honorary Board Seat on the 'New York State Committee To Legalize Marijuana' on 4/20/2015 by Dennis Levy, the HIV+ African American President.

In 2015, prompted by New York's Compassionate Care Act, Beal organized a patients' rights group, which drafted a bill requesting that NYC's City Council administer users' cooperatives for patients who need medical marijuana:

"We're trying to set up a five-borough patients co-op for people with serious maladies, including ones that aren't on the state list," says Dana Beal, a longtime cannabis activist and one of about ten contributors to the bill. "The law and the regulations don't cover people who are [also] legitimate patients. We believe that under home rule, we can extend better availability and better prices to more people.

During the 2016 US presidential election-campaign, Beal organized a demonstration in Scranton, Pennsylvania in which pro-cannabis activists carried a 51-foot, inflatable marijuana joint to a Hillary Clinton rally, while also passing around "an open letter to Hillary Clinton" asking her to remove cannabis from the Controlled Substances Act.

Yippie Museum

In 2004, the infamous Yippie "headquarters" at #9 Bleecker Street in New York City (also Beal's home for decades) officially became the Yippie Museum and Cafe and was legally chartered by the Board of Regents of New York State at their March 21, 2006 meeting. Its stated purpose was to preserve the activities and artifacts of the Youth International Party. Beal served on the museum/cafe's Board of Directors.

In January 2014, the 9 Bleecker Street building went into foreclosure. The old Yippie building was cleaned out and is now a boxing club called "Overthrow".

2000s-2010s arrests

Illinois (2008)
Beal was arrested June 3, 2008 in Mattoon, Illinois about 170 miles south of Chicago on suspicion of money laundering. The Associated Press reported that he appeared before a judge on June 12, and was charged with obstruction of justice. He was released on $7,500 bail.

According to The New York Times, police responded to a report of two women arguing at a restaurant. The 2 women were traveling with Beal and another man. Mick McAvoy is the first assistant state's attorney for Coles County, Illinois. According to the Times, "Mr. McAvoy said witnesses told the police that Mr. Beal had placed bags beneath nearby vehicles. Mr. McAvoy said the police found two duffel bags containing more than $150,000 in cash. At that point, Mr. McAvoy said, a drug-sniffing dog was brought in to smell the bags." According to Beal's attorney, Ronald Tulin of Charleston, Illinois, the police said the money smelled of marijuana. Beal has always said that the money was en route to support an ibogaine-based drug treatment clinic in Mexico.

On August 6, 2008 Judge Richard Scott found probable cause for a jury trial for Irvin Dana Beal, 61, of New York City and Jesse Balcom, 31, of Silver Spring, Maryland. The trial began in November 2008 on obstruction of justice charges, because it was alleged that Beal and his associate were hiding the bags of money in expectation that the police might search their van. The outcome of the trial was that Beal pleaded guilty to misdemeanor marijuana possession and was fined $1,300. Obstruction of justice charges were dismissed. Federal authorities are seeking forfeiture of the money involved.

Nebraska (2009)
Dana Beal, Christopher Ryan, and James Statzer were arrested at 10:35 p.m. on September 30, 2009 in Ashland, Nebraska. Police claim that they were stopped because the conversion van they were in was driving erratically, and because the rear license plate was obstructed. Police allegedly found 150 pounds of marijuana in the van. All 3 face charges of possession with intent to deliver and having no drug tax stamp. Ryan and Statzer were held on $100,000 bond each. Beal was held on $500,000 bond. According to the Omaha World-Herald, Saunders County Attorney Scott Tingelhoff said that there was an effort on the web to raise Beal's bail. He had to raise 10 percent ($50,000) in order to be released.

Beal was represented in his case by Glenn Shapiro of the law firm Schaefer and Shapiro in Omaha, Nebraska.

2011 arrest and conviction in Wisconsin
Dana Beal was arrested on Jan. 6, 2011 with 186 pounds of marijuana during a traffic stop in Barneveld, Wisconsin. He and driver Lance Ramer of Omaha, Nebraska were held on $50,000 bond each in the Iowa County Jail in Dodgeville.  Authorities won't release the police report because Federal officials say it might compromise a national drug investigation which runs "from California to New York, with multiple locations."

On September 20, 2011 Dana Beal was sentenced to  years in prison. He was credited with 267 days already served for the time he was in jail. He was also sentenced to  years parole after getting out of prison.

2011 heart attack and re-sentencing in Wisconsin

On September 27, 2011, the day he was to be transferred to a state prison in Wisconsin, Beal suffered a heart attack.  He had a double bypass operation a week later. Due to the health issues and costs Beal was released on bail while in the hospital. He was re-sentenced on December 29.  His prison sentence was reduced by six months.

Beal turned himself in to the Wisconsin prison system on February 15, 2012 to begin serving his sentence.  One week later he had another, minor, heart attack.  The next day a stent was placed in a coronary artery.

2012 bench trial and sentencing in Nebraska

On April 20, 2012 Beal was moved to the Saunders County jail in Wahoo, Nebraska, where he had a bench trial later that year, on August 27 related to the 2009 arrest.  On December 10, 2012, Judge Mary Gilbride sentenced Beal to 4 to 6 years in prison in Nebraska.    An appeal was filed. On 26 December 2012 Dana was moved from Nebraska back to Fox Lake Correctional Institution in Wisconsin.

2017 arrest in California

High Times account of the arrest of cannabis activist Dana Beal in December, 2017:

Beal and Statzer both entered pleas of not guilty. Beal was later released on bail. His lawyer had successfully argued that given age and  health issues, he was not a flight risk. Statzer was also released on bail.

Advocacy of Cynthia Nixon
In Spring 2018, Dana Beal supported New York gubernatorial candidate Cynthia Nixon, who spoke at the yearly New York City Cannabis parade in support of legalization.

Joints for Jabs
In Spring 2021, Beal organized "Joints for Jabs NYC" in Union Square, encouraging vaccination against COVID-19:[On] April 20, volunteers organized by Mr. Beal, members of the group ACT UP and others handed out more than a thousand joints to people who could show that they were at least 21 and had received a Covid vaccine. A similar distribution is planned for May 1 to coincide with an annual May Day marijuana march held in Manhattan.

See also
 List of civil rights leaders

References

External links 
 Dana Beal Liberation Poster -- Poster advocating Dana Beal's freedom : "As long as he sits, youth culture sits! free dana, free marijuana!"  Yippie poster, Madison, WI - 1971 - Wisconsin Historical Society.
 CannabisNews.com archive of media articles mentioning Dana Beal.
 High Times interview: Dana Beal by David Oliver (June 1977)
July 4th Smoke-In at Washington DC (1977) The Annual July 4 Smoke-In at Washington DC - film by Howard Lotsof and the Yippies - 26 minutes.  (prominently features Dana Beal.)
 Dana Beal on Ibogaine Clinics, and his 2008 arrest
 Dana Beal Interview by Saira Viola - International Times - 25 August 2016 (also contains small archive of Beal's activism : photos, posters, etc.) 
 Steal This Story : Hostage on Bleecker Street by Sidd Joag (May 5 2016) An account of a robbery at NY Yippie HQ in 2005 and its eventual aftermath; Dana Beal is central to the story.
 Longtime Marijuana Activist Dana Beal Arrested In California's Emerald Triangle CBS News Sacramento - December 20, 2017
 New York Times Salutes Dana Beal O'Shaughnessy’s Online - May 2021
Pols for pot: At cannabis rally victory lap, politicians pay respect to hippies who were there first by Paul DeRienzo/The Village Sun - May 2, 2021 

American cannabis activists
Living people
1947 births
Yippies
Ibogaine activists
People from Ravenna, Ohio
Activists from Ohio
American political writers
American political philosophers
Crimes in Humboldt County, California
Cannabis writers